The women's 3000 metres at the 2016 IAAF World Indoor Championships took place on March 20, 2016.

The favorite was obviously world record holder Genzebe Dibaba, but the Outdoor World Championships revealed an achilles heel, a long, drawn out kick.  The finals started off at a jog with Stephanie Twell and then Sviatlana Kudzelich on the front controlling the pace.  After six laps of this, Dibaba took off, running a 30-second lap and putting a 12-metre gap on the field.  From there, Dibaba maintained the gap then increased it at the end as the clear winner.  After Twell was the last to try to hold on to Dibaba, Meseret Defar was the last to chase.  Too familiar a situation from the past with Defar chasing a Dibaba, but those were Genzebe's older sister Tirunesh.  Defar had to take silver, still clear of the rest of the field.  It was her seventh medal in this event, dating back to 2003.  Behind them, Shannon Rowbury used her best 1500 metres kick to separate from Maureen Koster for bronze.

Results
The final was started at 13:45.

References

3000 metres
3000 metres at the World Athletics Indoor Championships
2016 in women's athletics